Beat Koch (born July 27, 1972) is a Swiss cross-country skier who competed from 1993 to 2006. Competing at the 1998 Winter Olympics in Nagano, he finished sixth overall in the 4 × 10 km relay and 17th individually in the 10 km events as his best finishes.

Koch's best finish at the FIS Nordic World Ski Championships was 16th in the 30 km event at Val di Fiemme in 2003. His best World Cup finish was 17th in a 15 km event in Germany in 2003.

Koch earned thirteen career victories in lesser events up to 30 km from 1997 to 2003.

World Cup results
All results are sourced from the International Ski Federation (FIS).

World Cup standings

References

External links

Olympic 4 x 10 km relay results: 1936-2002 

1972 births
Living people
Cross-country skiers at the 1998 Winter Olympics
Swiss male cross-country skiers
Olympic cross-country skiers of Switzerland